This is a list of notable people born or inhabitants of the city of Brighton and Hove in England. This includes the once separate towns of Brighton and Hove.

Note that in the case of persons still living, they may not currently live within the area of the city, but have done so at some time.

For clarification: note the distinction between Kemptown and Kemp Town.

B
Jack Ball (1923–1999), footballer
David Bangs, naturalist, social historian, public artist and author
Saffron Barker, YouTuber who lives and grew up with her family in Brighton
Darren Baxter, footballer
Raymond Briggs, artist, writer and illustrator of many children's books including The Snowman, taught at Brighton Art College
The indie rock band British Sea Power (Yan, Noble, Hamilton and Woody)
Ray Brooks, actor
George Brown, cricketer, born in Brighton in 1821
Janet Brown, actress and impersonator of Margaret Thatcher, lived in Hove
Steve Brown, football player (Charlton, Reading) and manager (Ebbsfleet), born in Brighton in 1972
Adrian Brunel, film director in the silent movie era
Isambard Kingdom Brunel, engineer, attended Dr Morell's school on Hove seafront, close to Hove Street, for several years from 1820
Dora Bryan, comic actress (whose Clarges hotel on Marine Parade was used in the Carry On films)
Margot Bryant, actress who played Minnie Caldwell in Coronation Street, lived at Fourth Avenue in Hove for many years
Janey Buchan, Scottish Labour MEP, died in Brighton in 2012
Arabella Buckley, writer and populariser of science, was born in Brighton in 1840
Nick Burbridge, author of poetry, plays, novel; songwriter-founder of folk rock McDermott's Two Hours
Richard Burchett, artist
Julie Burchill, journalist; founder of Modern Review
Rob Burley, television producer
Sir Edward Burne-Jones, Pre-Raphaelite artist; resident 1880–98
Sir John Cordy Burrows, surgeon and local politician; mayor of Brighton in 1857
Keith Burstein, composer, born (1957) and brought up in Hove
Steve Burtenshaw, football player (played for Brighton & Hove Albion), football manager and scout, born in Portslade in 1935
Sean Bury, actor, was born in Brighton in 1954
Charles Busby, Regency architect, prolific in Brighton; lived in Lansdowne Place; house is adorned by a blue commemorative plaque
Cecil Butcher, cricketer for Sussex, born in Brighton in 1872, died in Portslade in 1929
Dame Clara Butt, recitalist and concert singer, lived in St Aubyns Mansions between 1903 and 1906
Douglas Byng, comic singer and songwriter; lived in Arundel Terrace, Kemp Town; died in 1987

C
Duncan Campbell, investigative journalist and computer forensics expert
Victor Campbell, Antarctic explorer, born in Brighton in 1875
Aimée Campton (1882-1930) English-French actress
Marie-Antoine Carême, chef to the Prince Regent, inventor of chef's toque (hat)
Charles Carpenter, cricketer for Sussex
Edward Carpenter, poet and philosopher
 Denis Carter, Baron Carter, agriculturalist and Labour politician, spent some of his early life in Hove
Sam Carter, singer in British metalcore band Architects
Dirick Carver, Protestant martyr, 1554
Juan Francisco Casas, Spanish artist, has lived in Brighton
Michael Cashman, MEP and former EastEnders actor
Gwen Catley, soprano, died in Hove in 1996
Lennox Cato, expert on the Antiques Roadshow
Nick Cave, Australian musician, writer, and film maker
Gianni Celati, Italian writer, lives in Brighton
Celeste, American-born singer, grew up in Saltdean
Paul Cemmick, cartoonist, lives in Hove
Douglas Chamberlain, cardiologist, lives in Hove and worked at the Royal Sussex County Hospital for more than 20 years
Ian Chapman, footballer
Peter Chrisp, children's writer
Isaac Christie-Davies, footballer
Sir Winston Churchill, journalist and politician; attended a school run by the "Misses Thompson" in Hove
Louis Clark, footballer
Dave Clarke, techno DJ
Somers Clarke, architect and Egyptologist, born in Brighton in 1841
Jack Clayton, film director, was born in Brighton in 1921
Brendan Cleary, poet, has lived in Brighton 
John Clements, actor
Carol Cleveland, Monty Python actress
Bryan Clough, author of State Secrets: The Kent-Wolkoff Affair
Charles Clover-Brown, cricketer, died in Hove in 1982
Brian Cobby, former voice of the British Telecom speaking clock
C. B. Cochran, impresario, showman, born in Prestonville Road in the Prestonville area of Brighton in 1872
Alex Cochrane, footballer
Michael Cochrane, actor, born in Brighton in 1947
Admiral Sir Edward Codrington, hero of the Battle of Navarino; lived in 140 Western Road (1828–52); a blue commemorative plaque adorns the house
Robert Coffin, Catholic Bishop of Southwark, born in Brighton in 1819
Ben Cohen, author, publisher and distributor of bridge books and stationery supplies
Sophie Coleman, triathlete, born in Brighton in 1990
Jean Colin, 1930s film actress, was born in Brighton in 1905
David Collings, actor (Crime and Punishment, Doctor Who), born in Brighton in 1940
Geoffrey Collins, cricketer for Sussex, born in Brighton in 1918
Maria Colwell, born in Hove in 1965, killed in Brighton by her stepfather at age 7; a notorious case of child abuse resulting in a public enquiry
John Comber, cricketer for Sussex, born in Brighton in 1861
Ivy Compton-Burnett, novelist, grew up in Hove
Dainton Connell, a leading Arsenal hooligan, was born in Brighton in 1961
Clare Connor, played for Brighton College men's cricket team and England women's cricket team, was born in Brighton in 1976
John Constable, Romantic painter, intermittently lived in Brighton, calling it "Piccadilly by the Seaside";  resided at 11 Sillwood Road
Edward Tyas Cook, journalist, editor, man of letters, born in Brighton in 1857
Gaz Coombes, lead singer of band Supergrass, once lived in Brighton
George Coppard, corporal in the British Army, wrote With A Machine Gun to Cambrai (a popular memoir of World War I), born in Brighton in 1898
Beth Cordingly, actress (played PC Kerry Young in The Bill), was born in Brighton in 1977
David Cordingly, authority on pirates (of the pre-modern era), father of Beth Cordingly, lives in Brighton
Tich Cornford, cricketer for Sussex, died in Brighton
Tom Cotcher, Scottish actor, lives in Brighton
George Cotterill, footballer, born in Brighton in 1868
Joseph Cotterill, cricketer for Sussex (1870–1888), played once for England, born in Brighton in 1851
David Courtney, born David Cohen in Whitehawk, composer and record producer; discovered and co-wrote with Leo Sayer; also nephew of Henry Cohen who conceived and built Brighton Marina
Robin Cousins, figure skater, won gold at 1980 Olympics, lives in Brighton
Graham Coutts, murderer of Jane Longhurst in 2003, lived in Brighton
Sam Crane, actor, born in Brighton
Addison Cresswell, comedy agent, went to St Luke's Primary School and Brighton Polytechnic
Luke Cresswell, of musical performers Stomp
Henry Radcliffe Crocker, dermatologist, born in Hove in 1846
Lance Cronin, footballer
James Crump, founder of St. Aubyn's School (named after the Hove street in which he lived)
Thomas Cubitt, master builder, employed in the development of Kemp Town; lived in 13 Lewes Crescent
Graham Cutts, a leading British film director in the 1920s, was born in Brighton in 1885

D
James Daly, footballer
Tim Daniels, cricketer for Oxford UCCE, born in Brighton in 1980
Alfred Darling, pioneer film equipment manufacturer
Ralph Darling, Governor of New South Wales 1825–1831, who prevented theatre in Sydney, died in Brighton in 1858
John Davey, cricketer for the MCC and Sussex, born in Brighton in 1847, died in Brighton in 1874
Glen Davies, footballer, born in Brighton in 1976
Nicholas Davies, journalist associated with Robert Maxwell, lived in Brighton in 1993
Philip Davies, cricketer for Sussex, born in Brighton in 1893, attended Brighton College
Jill Day, singer and actress in the 1950s to early 1960s, was born in Brighton in 1930
Joe Day, footballer
Lewis Dayton, actor of the 1920s, was born in Brighton in 1889
Alex 'Ali Dino' Dean, bassist in UK metalcore band Architects
Roger Dean, artist, famous for prog-rock album covers
Frederick Delve, firefighter and chief of the London Fire Brigade, 1948–1962, was born in Brighton in 1902
John Leopold Denman, architect, designed many buildings in and around Brighton, was born in Brighton in 1882
Charlie Dennis, footballer
Alfie Deyes, YouTuber lives in Brighton
Amita Dhiri, actress, born in Brighton
Clarissa Dickson Wright, celebrity chef and television personality, attended Sacred Heart School (then in Hove)
Maude Dickinson, inventor
Jeremy Dier, tennis player
Coningsby Disraeli, Member of Parliament for Altrincham, nephew of Benjamin Disraeli, died in Hove in 1936
John Charles Dollman, painter and illustrator, born in Hove in 1851
Alan Donohoe, singer with the band The Rakes, lives in Brighton
Lord Alfred Douglas, poet and writer; friend and lover of Oscar Wilde
Angus Douglas-Hamilton, Victoria Cross recipient
David Downton, fashion illustrator, has lived in Brighton
Alfred Drayton, stage and film actor, born in Brighton
 Tim Dry, actor and artist, lived in Brighton in the 1970s
Graham Duff television writer and actor famous for BBC Three TV series ideal
Alice Dudeney, writer, born in Brighton in 1866
Polly Dunbar, illustrator and writer, went to Brighton University, now lives in Brighton
Lewis Dunk, footballer for Brighton & Hove Albion, born in Brighton in 1991
Richard Durrant, guitarist, born in Hollingbury, Brighton in 1962

E
Brian Eastman, film and television producer
Frederick Charles Eden, church architect and designer, born in Brighton in 1864
Connie Ediss, buxom comedian in Edwardian music hall, also acted in a few 1930s films, born and died in Brighton
Christiana Edmunds, "The Chocolate Cream Poisoner", while living in Brighton, poisoned several people (killing a four-year-old boy) with adulterated chocolate creams in the 1870s
Les Edwards, illustrator, lives in Brighton
Nick Van Eede, lead singer, Cutting Crew
Adam El-Abd, Egyptian-English footballer for Brighton & Hove Albion, was born in Brighton in 1984
Joe El-Abd, rugby union player, born in Brighton in 1980
Jago Eliot, Lord Eliot, involved in a variety of arts projects, briefly lived in Brighton
Charlotte Elliott, poet and hymn writer, lived in Brighton in the latter part of her life
G. H. Elliott, music hall singer and comedian, buried in Rottingdean church yard
Henry Venn Elliott, English divine, minister of St Mary the Virgin, Brighton, died at Brunswick Square 1865
Sean Ellis, film director, was born in Brighton c.1970
Steve Ellis, singer with the band Love Affair, lives in Brighton
Gary Elphick, footballer
Tommy Elphick, footballer
Harriet Elphinstone-Dick, early swimming champion, originally from Brighton, taught swimming at Brill's Baths in Pool Valley
Maurice Elvey, one of Britain's most prolific film directors of the silent era, died in a nursing home in Brighton in 1967
Bella Emberg, actress; co-star of The Russ Abbot Show
Revd. Richard Enraght, religious controversialist, curate of St. Paul's Church, Brighton 1867–71, and priest in Charge of St. Andrew's Church, Portslade 1871–74
Chris Eubank, ex-boxer, holds the purchased title of "Lord of the Manor of Brighton"
Chris Eubank, Jr., boxer, son of Chris Eubank, lives in Brighton
Maurice Evans, leading Shakespearan actor in the United States, regularly in Bewitched and Batman, and Dr Zaius in Planet of the Apes
Simon Evans, comedian, lives in Hove
George Everest, surveyor after whom the mountain was named, buried in Hove
 Marjorie Eyre, D'Oyly Carte soprano, died in Brighton in 1987

F
Michael Fabricant MP, born in Brighton in 1950; educated at the Brighton, Hove and Sussex Grammar School
Rotimi Fani-Kayode, photographer who explored sexuality, race and culture, lived in Brighton in his youth
Simon Fanshawe, broadcaster, writer, and comedian, lives in Kemptown
Joseph Jefferson Farjeon (1883–1955), crime novelist and playwright, died in Hove
Tommy Farr, boxer, "The Tonypandy Terror", ran a pub in Brighton after retirement
Fatboy Slim, real name Norman Cook, musician formerly of band The Housemartins
Steve Ferrone, drummer with Average White Band and for various high-profile performers, born in Brighton in 1950
Frank Finlay, actor, owned a house in Wyndham Street for 30 years until 2009
Fink (Fin Greenall) (born 1972), singer, songwriter, guitarist, producer, DJ, is based in Brighton
Maria Fitzherbert, illegitimate wife of George IV (under the Royal Marriages Act 1772 marriage of a member of the Royal Family without permission of the monarch was illegal)
Robert Thomas Flower, 8th Viscount Ashbrook, Irish aristocrat, Lieutenant-Colonel in the British Army, and inventor; lived at 22 Adelaide Crescent, Hove, in the 1860s
Russell Floyd, actor, lives in Brighton
Wes Fogden, footballer for Brighton & Hove Albion and various other clubs in the south of England, born in Brighton in 1988
Chris Foreman, nicknamed Chrissy Boy, guitarist, Madness.
Gustavus Fowke, cricketer for Leicestershire, born in Brighton in 1880
Derek Francis, comedy and character actor, was born in Brighton in 1923
Tommy Fraser, footballer
Darren Freeman, footballer
William Friese-Greene, cinematographic pioneer, subject of the film The Magic Box

G
Leon Garfield, novelist, born in Brighton in 1921
Sam Gargan, footballer
Constance Garnett, early translator of Tolstoy, Dostoyevsky and Chekhov, was born in Brighton and attended Brighton and Hove High School
David Garnett, novelist, Bloomsbury Group member, lover of Duncan Grant, was born in Brighton
John Garrick, film actor, was born in Brighton in 1902
Joe Gatting, cricketer and footballer
Leslie Gay (1871–1949), cricketer and footballer
George, Prince of Wales, Prince Regent, and later King George IV of the United Kingdom
Grant Gee, filmmaker and music video director
Genesis P-Orridge, real name Neil Megson, performance artist
Mikey Georgeson, artist, moved to Brighton in 1989
Dave Gibbons, comic book illustrator, famed for co-creating Watchmen
Annabel Giles, TV presenter, lives in Brighton
Eric Gill, typographer, engraver, sculptor, born in Brighton in 1882
Nick Gillard, stunt coordinator, Star Wars, Indiana Jones, Alien; was born and still lives in Brighton's North Laine
Charlie Gilmour, footballer
David Gilmour, guitarist and vocalist of Pink Floyd, owns house on Kings Esplanade, Hove
Harvey Goldsmith, rock promoter
Nat Gonella, singer and trumpeter, lived in Saltdean
William Gold, a.k.a Wilbur Soot, popular YouTuber and singer-songwriter, grew up in Brighton and currently resides there.
JoAnne Good, radio presenter and actress, lives in Brighton
Arthur Murray Goodhart, composer and organist, lived in Brighton
Leon Gordon, Hollywood screenwriter, born in Brighton in 1894
Theodore Gordon, Scottish inspector of army hospitals, died in Brighton in 1845
Colin Grant, author, lives in Brighton
Stephen Grant, comedian and writer, lives in Brighton and frequently performs in the town's Komedia venue
Emily Gravett, children's author and illustrator, lives in Brighton
Simon Greatwich, footballer
Graham Greene, writer (worked in but did not live in Brighton)
Dave Greenfield, keyboard player with The Stranglers, born in Brighton in 1949
Roy Greenslade, professor of journalism at City University London, media commentator and journalist for The Guardian and the London Evening Standard, has lived in Brighton since the 1970s
Lucy Griffiths, actress (attended Varndean College)
Ioan Grillo, journalist and author of the book El Narco: Inside Mexico's Criminal Insurgency
Nicholas Grimshaw, architect, designed Waterloo International railway station and the Eden Project, was born in Hove
Martha Gunn, famous dipper and friend of the Prince Regent
Sally Gunnell, athlete, Olympic 400m hurdles champion in 1992
Gerry Gurr, footballer

H
Almer Hall, football player and manager, was born in Hove
Brian Hall, actor (played Terry the chef in Fawlty Towers), born in Brighton in 1937
Grant Hall, footballer
Bertrand Hallward, university administrator and centenarian
Eamon Hamilton, of the band Brakes and formerly of British Sea Power
Kay Hammond, stage and film actress, wife of John Clements, died in Brighton in 1980
Robert Hammond, (1850-1915) pioneered electricity supply for shop lighting in Brighton in 1882
Gilbert Harding TV personality in the 1950s; lived in Clifton Terrace, Brighton
Cyriak Harris, British freelance animator, lived in Brighton for 10 years
Harry Harrison, science fiction writer, had a flat in Brighton for his visits to England
Phil Hartnoll, of band Orbital
Lee Harwood, poet, moved to Brighton in 1967
Tony Hawks, comedian, author and philanthropist
John Albert Hay, former British politician
Peter Thomas Hay, author
Michael Heath, cartoonist
Den Hegarty, of bands Darts and Rocky Sharpe and the Razors/Replays
Toby Hemingway, actor best known for playing Reid Garwin in The Covenant
Max Hemmings, footballer
Sue Hendra, author and illustrator
James Herbert, horror author of The Rats and The Fog
Phoebe Hessel, disguised herself as a man to join the British Army, moved to Brighton; died in 1821 aged 108; buried in the graveyard of St Nicholas Church, Brighton
Dave Hill, Marxist educator, grew up in Brighton and was a local Labour councillor
Rowland Hill, postal reformer
Steve Hillier of band Dubstar (Hove)
Daisy and Violet Hilton, conjoined twins born in Brighton in 1908; toured the US sideshow and Vaudeville circuit
Annie Holland, guitarist with Britpop band Elastica, lives in Brighton
Georg Hólm, bassist of Sigur Rós
Nicholas van Hoogstraten, multimillionaire and property tycoon
Rufus Hound, comedian and presenter
Richard Hough, writer on maritime history, was born in Brighton
Martin How, composer and organist with the Royal School of Church Music, briefly lived in Brighton as a child
Derek Hudson, conductor and composer in Rhodesia and Zimbabwe, born in Hove
Dionne Hughes, comedian and television presenter, briefly lived in Brighton
Herbert Hughes, Irish composer, collector of folk songs, died in Brighton in 1937
Jason Hughes, Welsh actor, lives in Brighton
Barbara Hulanicki, fashion designer and founder of Biba, moved to Brighton aged 12, studied at Brighton Art College
Jessica Hynes (née Stephenson), actress and writer, grew up in Brighton

I
Paul Ifill, footballer
Boyd Irwin, actor, appeared in 135 films between 1915 and 1948, was born in Brighton in 1880

J
Jacksepticeye, real name Seán William McLoughlin, Irish game commentator, currently lives in Brighton
Mick Jackson, writer, best known for novel The Underground Man, lives in Brighton
Edward James, poet and art collector, who lent many famous Surrealist works to Brighton Museum in the 1950s and 1960s
Peter James, writer of detective stories featuring Roy Grace, was born in Brighton
Samantha Janus, actress in EastEnders
Konrad Jarnot, opera singer
Michael Jayston, actor, lives in Hove
Teddy Jenks, footballer
Gwyneth Jones, novelist
Jenny Jones, prominent member of the Green Party, grew up in Brighton
Maggie Jones, Baroness Jones of Whitchurch, Labour politician, lives in Brighton
Peter Jones, actor and Just A Minute panellist; had a house in Hove in the 1970s
William Jones (1876–1959), footballer
Brandon Joseph-Buadi, footballer
Petra Joy, German feminist and advocate/producer of erotic films for women, lives in Brighton

K
Charles Albert Keeley, pioneering colour theorist and entertainer
Natasha Kaplinsky, journalist and newsreader
Tim Keegan, English musician, lives in Brighton
Nigel Kennedy, violinist, born at the Royal Sussex County Hospital and lived at Regency Square, Brighton and Lyndhurst Road, Hove during his childhood
Bobak Kianoush, member of boy band Another Level, born in Hove and attended Blatchington Mill School
Michael Kilgarriff, tall actor, born in Brighton in 1937
Alex King, rugby player
Matt King, actor and comedian; Super Hans in Peep Show
Philip King, playwright; wrote the farce See How They Run
William King, philanthropist; supporter of Cooperative Movement
Rudyard Kipling, author; lived in Rottingdean between 1897 and 1903
William Forsell Kirby, entomologist and folklorist, lived in Brighton
Prince Peter Alexeevich Kropotkin, Russian anarchist; resident 1912–17
Felix Kjellberg, Also known as PewDiePie, Popular Swedish YouTuber, lives in Brighton

L
Thomas Lainson, architect
Michael Langdon, opera singer, died in Hove in 1997
George Larner, race-walker; double gold medallist at 1908 Olympics
Walter Ledermann, mathematician, lived in Rottingdean and Hove
Vivien Leigh, actress, Scarlet O'Hara in Gone with the Wind
Alfred Lennon, father of John Lennon, was living in Brighton at the time of his death in 1976
PJ Liguori, internet personality and filmmaker under the name KickThePJ, who currently resides in Brighton
Fred Lillywhite, cricketer; organised first England overseas tour
David Lindsay, Scottish novelist (wrote A Voyage to Arcturus), ran a boarding house in Brighton, died in Hove in 1945
Ken Livingstone, politician; formerly Mayor of London; had a house in the Seven Dials area
Hugh Lloyd, actor and comedian, lived in Rottingdean
Jane Longhurst, killed by Graham Coutts; the Jane Longhurst Trust was set up to campaign for the criminalisation of what the Government labelled "extreme pornography", a move opposed by Backlash and the Consenting Adult Action Network
Jay Lovett, football player and manager
E G Handel Lucas (1861–1936), artist, lived in Brighton from 1909 to 1914
Greg Luer, footballer
Ida Lupino, actress and film-maker, daughter of Stanley Lupino, attended schools at Norman Road, Aldrington and Ventnor Villas, Hove and the Sunday school of All Saints Church, Hove
Desmond Lynam, broadcaster
Zoe Lyons, comedian, lives in Brighton

M
Matt Machan, Sussex cricketer
Percival Mackey, pianist, composer and music director in the early 20th century, lived in Brighton
Mathilde Madden, erotica author, lives in Brighton
Sake Dean Mahomet, introduced the Turkish bath to Britain
Stephen Mallinder, musician, lives in Brighton
Gideon Mantell, doctor, palaeontologist, discoverer of dinosaurs (Iguanodon), lived and worked in Brighton in the 1830s
Lesley Manville (born 1956), English actress
Edward Marshall-Hall, criminal barrister famous for Edwardian theatrics in court
Russell Martin, football player and manager
Niall Mason, footballer
Ivan Massow, entrepreneur
Susan Maughan, singer of hit record "Bobby's Girl", lived in Rottingdean
Peter Mayle, author of A Year in Provence
Conor Maynard, singer, was born in Brighton
Margaret Mayo, children's author, lives in Brighton
Pete McCarthy, actor and writer, lived in Brighton for a while, and List of Brighton & Hove bus names a local bus was named after him
Natascha McElhone, actress in Surviving Picasso, The Truman Show, Solaris, Californication; spent childhood in Brighton (attended St Mary's Hall)
Joe McGann, actor; star of The Upper Hand
Seán McLoughlin aka Jacksepticeye, popular Irish YouTuber, lives in Brighton
Kevin McNally, actor, lives in Brighton
Harriet Mellon (1777–1837), actress, wife of banker Thomas Coutts, had a house by Regency Square, Brighton
Alan Melville (1910–1983), revue author, playwright, lyricist, radio and TV personality; moved to Brighton in 1951 and lived in Clifton Terrace and Victoria Street
Sara Mendes da Costa, the British Telecom speaking clock
Kevin Meredith, a.k.a. Lomokev, photographer, lives and works in Brighton
Prince Klemens von Metternich (15 May 1773 – 11 June 1859), Austrian Foreign Minister, Diplomat and creator of the Congress of Vienna
Max Miller, comedian, the "Cheeky Chappie", born in Brighton in 1894, lived there most of his life; blue plaque at 160 Marine Parade and statue in New Road
Heather Mills, ex-wife of ex-Beatle Sir Paul McCartney, owns the vegan restaurant VBites in Hove
Fred Monk (1920–1987), football player and coach 
Bruce Montague, actor (played Leonard in Butterflies), lives in Brighton
Juan, Count of Montizón, the Carlist claimant to the throne of Spain and Legitimist claimant to the throne of France — lived in Hove c.1870s – 1887, where he died; funeral mass held in the Church of the Sacred Heart, Hove
William Moon, teacher and inventor of an alphabet for the blind
Gary Moore, musician, guitarist with Thin Lizzy amongst others as well as solo, lived in Hove
Ryan Moore, three-time champion jockey
Caitlin Moran, journalist, was born in Brighton
James Morrison, recording artist, lives in Hove
Garnt Maneetapho aka Gigguk, popular Thai-British YouTuber, born in Brighton in 1990

N
Dame Anna Neagle, actress; lived at Lewes Crescent, Kemp Town
Jo Neary, comedian, based in Brighton
Vivien Neves, British model
John Henry Newman, priest, writer, Catholic convert, Cardinal, now beatified, had a family home in Marine Square, Kemp Town, when he was a young man
Annie Nightingale, BBC TV and Radio presenter and sometime Brighton night-club owner
Michael Nightingale, film and television actor, born in Brighton in 1922
Ray Noble, band leader, composer, born 17 December 1903 in 1 Montpelier Terrace
Jeff Noon, speculative fiction writer
Henry Normal, comedian, writer and TV producer, lives in Brighton

O
Bridget O'Connor, author and playwright, lived in Hove
Peter O'Donnell, creator of Modesty Blaise
Natasha O'Keeffe, actress, was born in Brighton
Laurence Olivier (Lord Olivier) and Joan Plowright, lived at Royal Crescent 1960–78
John Osborne, playwright, lived in 7a Arundel Terrace, Kemp Town in the 1950s
Kitty O'Shea, wife of Charles Stewart Parnell
Denise Van Outen, television presenter, currently renovating a house 
Steve Ovett, Olympic runner, 800 metres gold medalist in 1980, born and brought up in Brighton; there was a statue of him in Preston Park, Brighton, which was stolen, and a replacement statue is in Madeira Drive;  was made Freeman of the city in July 2012
Bill Owen, actor, lived in Sussex Square in the 1950s
Tom Owen (born 1949), actor, son of Bill Owen, was born in Brighton
Adrian Oxaal, guitarist, formerly with James
Ocean Wisdom, rapper, grew up in Brighton

P
Will Packham, footballer
George Painter, biographer, died at Hove on 8 Dec 2005
Chris Paling, novelist
Patsy Palmer, EastEnders actress
Steve Palmer, footballer
Juliet Pannett (1911–2005), born in Hove, portrait artist
Charles Stewart Parnell, Irish politician, died in Brighton
Passenger, real name Mike Rosenberg, singer, is originally from Brighton
Heather Peace, actress and musician, lives in Brighton
David Pearce, philosopher
John Pedder (1784–1859), first Chief Justice of Van Diemen's Land, died in Brighton
Donald Peers, Welsh crooner, lived in St. John's Road, Hove; memorial tablet at Downs Crematorium
John Pelling, artist, born (1930) and raised in Hove
Laurie Penny, columnist and blogger, grew up in Brighton, attended Brighton College
Fred Perry, tennis player, lived in Rottingdean
Roland Pertwee, playwright, screenwriter and actor; was born and grew up in Denmark Villas, Hove
 Felix Arvid Ulf Kjellberg, better known by online pseudonym PewDiePie, Swedish internet personality, who currently resides in Brighton
Otto Pfenninger (1855–1929), moved to Brighton where he pioneered colour photography
Sir Richard Phillips (1767–1840), author, died in Brighton
Samuel Phillips (1814–1854), journalist, died in Brighton
Karen Pickering, swimmer, former 200 metres freestyle champion
David Pilbeam, anthropologist
Alan Pipes, author and illustrator
Adam Pitts, drummer of the band Lawson
Andrew Plimer (1763–1837), portrait miniaturist, died in Brighton
Joan Plowright, see Lord Olivier, above
Tony Pollard (born 1965), battlefield archaeologist, lived in Brighton 1995–1997
Peter Polycarpou, actor, was born in Brighton 
Tim Pope, film director and video maker
John Cyril Porte (1884–1919), flying boat pioneer, died in Brighton
Samuel Preston, lead singer of the band The Ordinary Boys, formally married to Celebrity Big Brother winner, Chantelle Houghton
Katie Price, model (also known as Jordan)
Partho Sen-Gupta, film director and scriptwriter (resident since October 2006)
Luke Pritchard, lead singer and rhythm guitarist for The Kooks
Jay Purvis (born 1976), Canadian model and television presenter, lived in Brighton in his youth

Q
Roger Quilter, composer, born at 4 Brunswick Square, Brunswick Town in 1877

R
Thomas Raikes (1777–1848), dandy, friend of Beau Brummell, the Duke of Wellington and Talleyrand, died in Brighton soon after buying a house there
Peggy Ramsay (1908–1991), theatrical agent, lived in Kensington Place, Brighton; blue plaque at the property
Robert Rankin, author
Terence Rattigan, playwright, author of The Browning Version and The Winslow Boy lived at Bedford House, 79 Marine Parade; blue plaque at the property
Tom Raworth, poet, lived in Brighton; now lives in Hove
Rita Ray, former singer with the Darts, latterly radio presenter and DJ
Glen Rea, footballer
Amanda Redman, actress, born in Brighton in 1957
Matt Redman, Christian musician, lives in Brighton
Siân Rees, English historian of the 17th and 18th centuries, lives in Brighton
Terence Reese, from London, a national and international award-winning player of and highly regarded writer on contract bridge; a writer on other games; died at the age of 83 of aspirin poisoning on January 29, 1996, at his residence at 23 Adelaide Crescent; an inquest ruled his death accidental
Philip Reeve, novelist; grew up in Brighton
Louise Rennison, writer (author of Angus, Thongs and Full-Frontal Snogging) and comedian, went to Brighton University, and lived in Brighton
Sam Rents, footballer
Dakota Blue Richards, actress, lives in Brighton, attended Brighton College
Laurence Rickard, actor, writer, notable for his role in the Horrible Histories television series, was born and still lives in Brighton
Mike Ring, footballer, born in Brighton in 1961
Rizzle Kicks, hip-hop duo
Haydon Roberts, footballer
Paul Roberts, frontman and singer with pop band the Stranglers; session singer and actor
Simon Roberts, photographer, lives in Brighton
Frederick William Robertson, Anglican divine
George Robey (1869–1954), music hall comedian, lived in Arundel Drive, Saltdean until his death
Jake Robinson, footballer
Dame Flora Robson, actress, 1960 until her death in 1984, famous as Elizabeth I
Dame Anita Roddick, founder of The Body Shop, opened first shop in Kensington Gardens, Brighton in 1976; a blue commemorative plaque marks the building
John Roman Baker, poet, playwright and novelist, spent his childhood and much of his adult life in Brighton
Martin Rossiter, singer with the band Gene, lives in Brighton
Arnold Ruge, German philosopher and political writer, lived in exile in Brighton from 1850 until his death in 1880
Dr. Richard Russell (1687–1759), encouraged the submersion in and drinking of seawater; buried in the churchyard of St Nicholas Church, Brighton
Gilbert Ryle, philosopher
John Alfred Ryle, professor of medicine at Cambridge and Oxford; physician to George V; brother of Gilbert Ryle
Martin Ryle, winner of 1974 Nobel Prize in Physics

S
 Charles Sabini, criminal, said to have lived in the Grand Hotel, Brighton, ran protection rackets against bookmakers; inspiration for character Colleoni in Graham Greene's Brighton Rock
Victoria Sackville-West, had two houses in Sussex Square, Kemp Town conjoined by Sir Edwin Lutyens, who also built her another at nearby Roedean
Sir Albert Abdullah David Sassoon, British Indian philanthropist and merchant, 1st Baronet Sassoon
Sir Edward Albert Sassoon, businessman and politician, MP for Hythe, whose mausoleum became the Hanbury Arms; 2nd Baronet Sassoon, of Kensington Gore
Tom Sayers, boxer
Leo Sayer, singer born in Shoreham-by-Sea lived in Brighton, discovered in Brighton by David Courtney
Paul Scofield, actor, lived in Brighton as a child and went to school there
Tom Searle, guitarist of UK Metalcore band Architects
Dan Searle, drummer of UK Metalcore band Architects
Captain Sensible, punk musician with The Damned
Jake Shillingford, musician and front-man of My Life Story
Roy Skelton, actor and voice of the Daleks
Sylvia Sleigh, artist
Alistair Slowe, footballer
George Albert Smith, pioneering early cinematographer, lived and built a studio in Hove
John Smith, Knight Grand Cross of the Royal Guelphic Order
Kevin Smith, cricketer
Jack Smith, painter
Jimmy Somerville, musician formerly of band The Communards
Wilbur Soot, YouTuber and musician, lives in Brighton
Ewen Spencer, photographer
Herbert Spencer, philosopher and political theorist
Mimi Spencer, journalist, lives in Brighton
Andi Spicer, composer, lives in Brighton
Victor Spinetti, actor, film, stage TV, lived in Kemp Town
Dusty Springfield, singer, had a home in Wilbury Road, Hove
Arthur Stanley-Clarke, first-class cricketer and British Army officer
Jesse Starkey, footballer
Paul Stenning, author, was born and lived in Brighton as a child
Jordan Stephens, singer in the duo Rizzle Kicks
Fin Stevens, footballer
Victor Stiebel, fashion designer, lived in Chichester Terrace
Jack Strachey, composer and songwriter, lived in Brighton towards the end of his life
Brian Street, anthropologist; lived in Brighton, died in Hove
Andy Sturgeon, garden designer (winner at 2010 Chelsea Flower Show), has lived in Brighton
Zoe Sugg, YouTuber lives in Brighton
Joakim Sundström, Swedish sound editor, sound designer and musician
Keston Sutherland, poet, lives in Brighton
Suvadhana, Thai princess, lived in Brighton in the middle of the 20th century

T
Chris T-T, singer-songwriter, lives in Brighton
Tagore family, of Kolkata, owned a house here in the 19th century
Sir Peter Tapsell, Conservative Party politician, was born in Brighton
Keith Taylor, Member of the European Parliament for the Green Party, lives or lived in Brighton
Maui Taylor, Filipino actress, big in the Philippines, born in Brighton
Noah Taylor, Australian actor and musician, lives in Brighton
Chris Terrill, adventurer, anthropologist and filmmaker
Angela Thirkell, buried in St Margaret's Church, Rottingdean
David Thomas, lead singer of Pere Ubu, Rocket from the Tombs, and David Thomas & Two Pale Boys
Francis Tillstone, Brighton's Town Clerk from 1881 to 1904
Peter Tobin (born 1946), serial killer, lived in Brighton in the 1970s and 1980s
Denise Tolkowsky, composer
Tony Towner, footballer
Arthur Treacher, actor
Tommy Trinder comedian, owned and lived in 71 Marine Parade
Jack Tripp, English pantomime dame, died 2005
Lynne Truss, writer; author of Eats, Shoots & Leaves
Roger Tucker (born 1945), television and film director
Ed Turns, footballer
Keith Tyson, artist and Turner Prize winner in 2002, studied Critical Fine Art Practice at Brighton University's Grand Parade campus

V
David Van Day, singer
Ralph Vaughan Williams, composer, went to school in Rottingdean
Wanda Ventham, actress, was born in Brighton
Adam Virgo, footballer
Magnus Volk, electrical engineer and inventor

W
Johnny Wakelin, musician, born in Brighton in 1939
Peter Wales, Sussex cricketer, born in Hove in 1928
Seann Walsh, comedian, brought up in Brighton
Keith Waterhouse CBE, journalist, novelist and playwright, lived in Embassy Court, Brighton
David Watkin, Oscar and BAFTA winning cinematographer, lived in Sussex Mews, Kemp Town until his death in 2008
Alan Weeks, BBC sports commentator, notably for ice hockey and other winter sports, grew up in Brighton and died in Hove
Scott Welch, boxer, moved to Brighton at age 16
Paul Weller, footballer
Louise Wener, lead singer of 1990s Britpop band Sleeper and author
Ben Wheatley, film director, lives in Brighton and made the film Down Terrace
David Wheeler, footballer
Gary Whelan, Irish actor, lives in Brighton and owns the Lion & Lobster pub there
Thomas and Alex White, musicians and members of Electric Soft Parade and Brakes
Wildman Whitehouse, surgeon and destroyer of the first transatlantic telegraph cable
Rachel Whiteread, artist and Turner Prize winner in 1993
Octavia Wilberforce, doctor, suffragist, founder of New Sussex Hospital for Women, and lifelong partner of Elizabeth Robins, had a home and medical practice in Montpelier Crescent
Herbert Wilcox, film producer and director lived in Lewes Crescent, Kemp Town
Amon Wilds and his son Amon Henry Wilds, both Regency architects, prolific in Brighton
Stan Willemse (1924–2011), footballer
Billy Williams, Australian music hall performer, died in Hove in 1915
Mark Williams, member of The Fast Show team and actor in the Harry Potter films
James Williamson, cinema pioneer, had a chemist's shop in Church Road, Hove before building a studio in Cambridge Grove
Holly Willoughby, television presenter, born in Brighton
Joe Lee Wilson, jazz singer
John Wisden, cricketer, founded Wisden Cricketers' Almanack
Robert Wisden, actor, was born in Brighton
W.I.Z., music video director
Eliza Wyatt, American playwright and author

Y
 Bernard Youens, actor who played Stan Ogden in Coronation Street, was born in Hove
 Robert Young, guitarist and co-founder of Primal Scream, lived in Hove
 Robyn Young, author

Z
 Helen Zahavi, writer
 Paul Zenon, magician

See also
 List of people from Sussex

References

Bibliography

Brighton and Hove, United Kingdom
Brighton and Hove-related lists